Dactyladenia johnstonei is a species of plant in the family Chrysobalanaceae. It is endemic to Cameroon. Its natural habitats are forested valley slopes, at altitudes of 950–1,600 m. It is threatened by habitat loss due to logging and clearance for agricultural land.

References

johnstonei
Endemic flora of Cameroon